Petar Sarić is a Serbian poet and prose writer.

Biography
Petar Sarić was born in the village of Tupan, near Nikšić in Montenegro in 1937. He is a graduate of the University of Priština Faculty of Philology in languages and literature. Upon graduation, he taught in several schools in both Prizren and Rahovec before joining the newspaper staff of the Priština daily Jedinstvo where he later held the post of editor-in-chief for several years. He authored volumes of verse, the first of which was published in the 1970s.

Sarić's best selling work "Mitrova Amerika" (Mitar's America) is the Serbian literary contribution to the topic of immigration to the New World. He is also a Serbian activist in Kosovo who raises questions when Albanian authorities abuse their power.

Selected works
 Sutra stiže gospodar ("Tomorrow the Lord is Coming" in two volumes, Belgrade, 1979 and 1981)
 Mitrova Amerika ("Mitar's America")

References 

20th-century Serbian writers
21st-century Serbian writers
1937 births
Living people